Waldo was a ghost town in Santa Fe County, New Mexico, United States.

Description
The community was created along the Atchison, Topeka and Santa Fe Railway just west of Cerrillos. Today little remains, although the name appears on a freeway exit on Interstate 25, some distance to the west. Today, Waldo is a siding along the line of the BNSF Railway, which bought out the Atchison, Topeka and Santa Fe Railway.

Waldo was at the junction of the AT&SF main east-west line and the Madrid spur. There were coke ovens in Waldo, supplied by coal from Madrid. The spur itself no longer exists. The ovens were on the south side of the mail line, and the town on the north. The rail line parallels the Galisteo River.

See also

References

External links

 Flickr slideshow of Waldo

Populated places in Santa Fe County, New Mexico
Ghost towns in New Mexico